Iolani is a masculine Hawaiian name meaning "royal hawk." It comes from the Hawaiian words ʻio, meaning "Hawaiian hawk," and lani, meaning "royal."

It may refer to:

ʻIolani School, a private school located in Hawaii
ʻIolani Palace, a museum and former residence of the monarchs of Hawaii
ʻIolani Barracks, barrack for the Royal Guards
Alexander Liholiho Iolani, also known as Kamehameha IV, Hawaii's fourth king, for which the palace was named
Liholiho Iolani, King Kamehameha II (who died in 1824), Kamehameha IV's namesake